Bathyferula is a genus of sea snails, marine gastropod mollusks, unassigned to a family within the superfamily Conoidea.

Species
Species within the genus Cryptomella include:
 Bathyferula delannoyei Stahlschmidt, D. Lamy & Fraussen, 2012

References

 Stahlschmidt P., Lamy D. & Fraussen K. (2012) Bathyferula, a new Caribbean deep-water turrid genus (Gastropoda: Turroidea), with description of a large-sized new species. Zootaxa 3158: 65–68.

External links

Marine gastropods
Conoidea